Lieutenant-General John Brown (died 1762) was a British Army officer.

He entered the Army as a cornet of Horse on 5 August 1704, and served several campaigns on the Continent in the army commanded by the Duke of Marlborough. In 1735 he was lieutenant-colonel of the 4th Regiment of Dragoons, from whence he was removed to the lieutenant-colonelcy of the King's Horse (later 1st Dragoon Guards), and on 10 May 1742 he was appointed colonel of the 9th Dragoons. On the appointment of Lieutenant-General Lord Tyrawley to the Horse Grenadier Guards, the colonelcy of the 5th Horse was conferred on Colonel Brown, 1 April 1743. He was promoted to the rank of major-general on 26 March 1754, and to that of lieutenant-general on 15 January 1758.

References
 page 89.

1762 deaths
British Army lieutenant generals
1st King's Dragoon Guards officers
4th Royal Irish Dragoon Guards officers
4th Queen's Own Hussars officers
9th Queen's Royal Lancers officers
British military personnel of the War of the Spanish Succession
Year of birth unknown